Apgujeong High School is a public high school located in Seoul, South Korea. It was founded in 1987 as Gujeong High School, and changed its name to Apgujeong High School  on September 1, 2009.

Notable alumni

 Choi Si-won
Choi Jae-ho
Im Na-yeon 
Jay Park
 Jun Hyo-seong
 Kim Nam-joon 
Kwon Hyun-bin
Min Yoon-gi 
Park Soo-ah
Park Solomon
Seo Hyun-jin
Yoo Jeong-yeon
Kim Doyoung Treasure

References

External links 
 

High schools in Seoul
1987 establishments in South Korea
Educational institutions established in 1987